Silver Lining is an album by the American musician Nils Lofgren, released in 1991.

The album peaked at No. 153 on the Billboard 200. "Valentine", featuring harmony vocals by Bruce Springsteen, was the album's first single.

Production
The album was produced by Kevin McCormick and Lofgren. It was recorded at Ocean Way Studios, in Los Angeles. Lofgren chose to add elements of soul and blues to his rock sound. Ringo Starr played drums on "Walkin' Nerve". Billy Preston and Clarence Clemons also contributed to Silver Lining.

Critical reception

Entertainment Weekly wrote: "A few tracks are little more than well-worn white R&B riffs with throwaway lyrics. But after years of second-banana status and flop albums that would demoralize the best of us, Lofgren displays a feisty exuberance on Silver Lining that's close to inspirational." The Windsor Star thought that "each cut here is a carefully thought-out rock statement, marvellously melodic, and exciting."

The Ottawa Citizen determined that the album "has a strong blues influence interwoven with Lofgren's biting, melodic rock ... Graceful passages give way to hard-edged guitar, often within the same song." The Chicago Tribune deemed it "another characteristically smooth yet energetic set of solid rock."

AllMusic wrote that "although Lofgren is a rocker first and foremost, he is hardly oblivious to soul music and the blues."

Track listing
All tracks composed by Nils Lofgren

Personnel
Nils Lofgren - guitar, vocals
Kevin McCormick - bass
Andy Newmark - drums
Scott Thurston - keyboards (tracks 2,4,5,7)
Levon Helm - harmonica and vocals (tracks 1,6,9)
Kevin Russell - guitar (track 6)
Ringo Starr - drums and vocals (tracks 3,8)
Billy Preston - organ (tracks 1,6,8)
Bruce Springsteen - vocals (track 2)
Clarence Clemons - saxophone (track 6)

References

Nils Lofgren albums
1991 albums
Rykodisc albums